The Love Chronicles is the second studio album by Canadian R&B singer Divine Brown.

Track listing
 "Lay It on the Line" – 3:41
 "Bebe" – 3:14
 "Meet Me at the Roxy" – 3:32
 "I Need Your Love" – 3:14
 "Sweet Surrender" – 3:38
 "Next Best Thing" – 3:30
 "Boogie Slide" – 4:48
 "One More Chance" – 4:31
 "Best Friend" – 3:39
 "Sunglasses" (featuring Nelly Furtado) – 3:55
 "It's Over" – 4:36
 "Jump Start" – 4:00
 "Dirty Day" – 2:12

Bonus tracks:
<li>"Lay It on the Line" (The Starting From Scratch + Solitair Retouch) – 3:44
<li>"Dance with Me" – 3:52

iTunes bonus:
<li>"Lay It on the Line" (Music Video) – 3:46

Awards

References

2008 albums
Divine Brown albums
Juno Award for R&B/Soul Recording of the Year recordings